Novaya Serebryakovka is a rural locality (a selo) and the administrative centre of Novoserebryakovsky Selsoviet, Kizlyarsky District, Republic of Dagestan, Russia. The population was 764 as of 2010. There are 7 streets.

Geography 
Novaya Serebryakovka is located 250 km northeast of Kizlyar (the district's administrative centre) by road. Chernyayevka and Sar-Sar are the nearest rural localities.

Nationalities 
Dargins, Chechens, Aghuls, Russians, Tabasarans, Kumyks and Avars live there.

References 

Rural localities in Kizlyarsky District